(Main list of acronyms)


 R –  (i) Reinforcing – Right – (s) Röntgen – (i) Restricted (movie rating)

R0–9
 R@R-(I) Respond as Receipt
 R0–99 – (i) R-value (insulation)
 R2I – (i) Resistance to Interrogation
 R3P – (i) Rearm, Refuel, and Resupply Point

RA
 Ra – (s) Radium
 RA – (a) Radio Australia
 RA
 (i) Radio altimeter
 (s) Rain (METAR Code)
 (i) Rear Area
 Reinforced Alert
 Republican Army
 (i) Resolution advisory
 Right Ascension
 Royal Academy
 Royal Artillery (UK)
 RAA
 (a) Royal Automobile Association
 (i) Rear Assembly Area
 RAAF – (i) Royal Australian Air Force
 Rabobank – (p) Raiffeisen-Boerenleenbank (from the two banks that merged to form the modern company)
 RAC
 (i) Royal Automobile Club (in the United Kingdom, renamed RAC plc in 2002)
 Rutgers Athletic Center, an indoor arena at the New Brunswick–Piscataway campus of Rutgers University
 RACK – (a) Risk Aware Consensual Kink (SM phrase)
 Racon – (p) RAdar beaCON
 RADA – (a) Royal Academy of Dramatic Art
 Radar – (p) Radio Detection And Ranging
 RADB
 (i) Real America Database
 Resource Assessment Database
 Reunion Address DataBase
 Rice Allelopathy Data Base
 Routing Arbiter Database
 RADb – (i) Routing Assets Data Base
 RadB – (s) Rad51/Dmc1 homologous protein
 RADC – (i) Region Air Defence Commander
 RAE – (i) UK Royal Aircraft Establishment (−1991)
 RAF – (i) Red Army Faction – Royal Air Force
 RAG
 (a) Raising and Giving
 Rocket Antitank Grenade
 RAGBRAI – (a) Register's Annual Great Bicycle Ride Across Iowa
 RAM – (a) Random Access Memory – Rolling Airframe Missile – Royal Air Maroc
 Ramark – (p) RAdar MARKer
 RAOC – (i) Rear Area Operation Centre
 RAP
 (a/i) Radio Access Point
 Radiological Assistance Program (U.S. Department of Energy)
 Rear Area Protection
 Recognised [Operating/Operational] Air Picture
 Recurring Advance Payment
 Relational Associative Processor
 Reliable Acoustic Path
 Rocket-Assisted Projectile
 Rule against perpetuities
 RAPIDS – (a) Real-Time Automated Personnel Identification System (US Department of Defense personnel authentication system)
 RARDE – (a) UK Royal Armament Research and Development Establishment (1962–1991)
 RARE – (a) Rapid Acquisition with Relaxation Enhancement (MRI technique)
 RASC – (a) Royal Army Service Corp (former corps of British Army)
 RATELO – (p) Radiotelephone Operator

RB
 Rb – (s) Rubidium
 RB – (i) Running Back (football)
 R&B – (i) Rhythm and Blues
 RBAR – (i) Row By Agonizing Row – a derogatory way of describing a technique of scanning a set of records in a database to update or examine the contents of each one.  This is the technique of last resort in most cases, since most database operations are optimized when using set based analysis instead of the RBAR method.
 RBCI – (i) Radio Based Combat Identification
 RBI
 (i) Reserve Bank of India
 (i) Runs batted In
 RBOC – (a/i) Regional Bell Operating Company ("Baby Bell")

RC
 RC – see entry
 RCA
(i) Radio Corporation of America
 Root Cause Analysis
 Royal Canadian Artillery
 Royal City Avenue (famous entertainment zone in Thailand)
 RCAF – (i) Royal Canadian Air Force
 RCAR – (a) Research Council for Automobile Repairs ("are-car")
 RCC – (i) Rescue Co-ordination Centre
 RCCO – (i) Royal Canadian College of Organists
 RCHA – (i) Royal Canadian Horse Artillery (regiment)
 RCMP – (i) Royal Canadian Mounted Police
 RCRA – (a) Resource Conservation and Recovery Act ("reck-ra" or "rick-ra")
 RCS
 (i) Radar Cross-Section
 Reaction Control System
 Revision Control System
 RCT
 (i) Randomized Controlled Trial
 Robotically Controlled Telescope
 Rugby club toulonnais (French, "Toulon Rugby Club")
 RCZ – (i) Rear Combat Zone

RD
 R&D – (i) Research & Development
 RD – Radio Disney
 RDA
 (i) Research, Development, and Acquisition
 Recommended Daily Allowance (Nutrition)
 RDD – (i) Radiological Dispersion Device
 RDDL – (a/i) Resource Directory Description Language ("riddle")
 RDECOM – (p) (U.S. Army) Research, Development and Engineering Command
 RDM – (i) Remotely Delivered/Deliverable Mine
 RDO
 (i) Rapid, Decisive Operation(s)
 Regular Day Off
 Remote Data Objects
 RDS
 (i) Amazon Relational Database Service
 (i) Remote Desktop Services (Microsoft service)
 (i) Réseau des sports (French, "Sports Network" — Canadian French-language TV channel)
 (i) Respiratory distress syndrome
 (i) Royal Dublin Society (see also RDS Arena, a stadium on the grounds often called "the RDS")
 RDT – (i) Remote Digital Terminal
 RDTE or RDT&E – (i) Research, Development, Test, and Evaluation
 RDV – (i) Remote Detection Vehicle

RE
 Re – (s) Rhenium
 RE – (i) Requirements Engineering
 RE – (s) Royal Engineers
 REACH – (p) Registration, Evaluation, Authorisation and Restriction of Chemicals
 REACT – (a) Remote Electronically Activated Control Technology
 REAM – (a) Retired Educators Association of Minnesota
 RECCE – (a) Reconnaissance
 REEF – (a) Reef Environmental Education Foundation
 REM – (i/a) Rapid Eye Movement (sleep phase) – Rosicrucian Egyptian Museum
 REME – (a) Royal Electrical and Mechanical Engineers
 RERC – (i) Rehabilitation Engineering Research Center
 RES – (i) Radiation Exposure Status – (p) Reserve
 RESNA – (a) Rehabilitation Engineering and Assistive Technology Society of North America
 REU – (s) Réunion (ISO 3166 trigram)

RF
 Rf – (s) Rutherfordium
 RF – (i) Radio Frequency – Receptive Field (neurophysiology)
 RFA – (i) Restrictive Fire Area (military) – Royal Field Artillery
 RFC – (i) Request for Comments – Royal Flying Corps (WWI precursor to RAF)
 RFD – (a) Request for Documentation
 RFE – (i) Request for Evaluation
 RFEF – (i) Real Federación Española de Fútbol (Spanish for Royal Spanish Football Federation)
 RFF – (i) Right of First Refusal (legal term)
 RFI –  (i) Ready For Inspection – Ready For Issue – Request For Information – Radio Frequency Interference
 RFID – (p) Radio Frequency IDentification
 RFL – (i) Rugby Football League
 RFL – (i) Restrictive Fire Line (military)
 RFP – (a) Request for Proposal
 RFQ – (a) Request for Quotation
 RFT – (a) Request for Tender
 RFU – (i) Rugby Football Union

RG
 Rg – (s) Roentgenium
 RG – (i) Republican Guard
 RGB – (i) Red Green Blue (colour model)
 RGBI – (i) Red Green Blue Intensity (ditto)

RH
 Rh – (s) Rhodium
 RH – (s) Southern Rhodesia (ISO 3166 digram; obsolete 1980)
 RHIC – (i) Relativistic Heavy Ion Collider
 RHLI – (i) Royal Hamilton Light Infantry (Canadian militia regiment)
 RHO – (s) Southern Rhodesia (ISO 3166 trigram; obsolete 1980)
 RHS –  (i) Right Hand Side – Redland High School – (a) Royal Horticultural Society – London
 RHU – (i) Replacement Holding Unit
 RHWR – (i) Radar Homing and Warning Receiver ("raw" for short)

RI
 RI – (s) Rex et Imperator, Regina et Imperatrix King-Emperor
 RI – (s) Rhode Island (postal symbol)
 RIAA – (i) Recording Industry Association of America
 RIBA – (a) Royal Institute of British Architects
 RIF
 (i) Reduction In Force (layoffs)
 Resistance Index for Frostbite
 Reading Is Fundamental
 RIFA – (a) Red imported fire ant
 RILA – (a) Retail Industry Leaders Association
 RIM
 (a) Remote integrated multiplexer, Australian term for a digital loop carrier
 Research In Motion, former name of the BlackBerry company 
 Revolutionary Internationalist Movement (Maoist organization)
 Royal Indian Marine, former navy of British colonial India
 RIMVS – (i) Retinal Imaging Machine Vision System
 RINO – (a) Republican In Name Only
 RIP
 (a/i) Relief In Place
 (i) requiesca[n]t in pace (Latin for "may he/she/they rest in peace")
 RIS
 (i) Range Instrumentation System
 Réseau Info Sports (French, roughly "Sports News Network" — Canadian French-language TV channel)
 RISC – (i) Reduced Instruction Set Computer
 RISD – (p) Rhode Island School of Design ("riz-dee")
 RISTA – (a) Reconnaissance, Intelligence, Surveillance, and Target Acquisition (see also ISTAR)
 RWH – (a) Rain Water Harvesting

RJ
 RJD – (i) Reduced Julian Day

RK
 RKBA – Right to Keep and Bear Arms (Second Amendment to the United States Constitution)
 RKI – (i) Robert Koch Institute, German governmental research institute in Berlin
 RKO – (i) Radio-Keith-Orpheum Pictures

RL
 rL – (i) Rontolitre
 RL – (i) Release Line – Real Life – Ronnalitre
 RLP – (i) Recognised [Operating/Operational] Land Picture
 RLS – (i) Restless Leg Syndrome
 RLY – (p) Rally Point

RM
 RM – see separate disambiguation page
 rm – (s) Raeto-Romansh language (ISO 639-1 code)
 RMA – (i) Return Mailing Authorization – Revolution in Military Affairs – Rachel McAdams
 RMC – (i) Robert Menzies College
 RMC – (ii) Royal Military College (Australia, Canada, UK)
 RMDA – (i) Records Management and Declassification Agency
 RMP – (i) Recognised [Operating/Operational] Maritime Picture
 RMS –  (i) Rate-Monotonic Scheduling – Richard M. Stallman – Root-Mean-Square – Royal Mail Ship (e.g. RMS Titanic)

RN
 rn – (s) Rundi language (Kirundi) (ISO 639-1 code)
 Rn – (s) Radon
 RN – (a) Radio Netherlands
 RN – (i) Royal Navy – Registered Nurse (US)
 RNA – (i) RiboNucleic Acid
 RNAD – Royal Naval Armaments Depot (UK)
 RNPS – (i) Radio Network Planning System
 RNZ – (a) Radio New Zealand
 RNZI – (a) Radio New Zealand International

RO
 ro – (s) Romanian language (ISO 639-1 code)
 RO – (i) Range Only – Red Orchestra – (s) Romania (ISO 3166 and FIPS 10-4 country code digram)
 ROA – (a/i) Rate Of Ascent
 ROC – (i/a) Receiver Operating Characteristic (statistics) –  Regional Operations Centre – Republic Of China – Roc-A-Fella Records – Regional Organisations of Councils
 ROCV or ROC-V – (i) Recognition Of Combat Vehicles ("rock-vee")
 ROD – (a/i) Rate Of Descent – Record Of Decisions – Report Of Discrepancy
 ROE – (i) Rules Of Engagement
 roh – (s) Raeto-Romansh language (ISO 639-2 code)
 ROH – (i) Ring of Honor
 ROI – (i) Return On Investment, Republic of Ireland.
 ROME – (a) Return On Modeling Effort
 ROFL(MAO) – (i) Rolling On the Floor Laughing (My Ass Off)
 ROFLOL – (i) Rolling On the Floor Laughing Out Loud
 ROK – (a/i) Republic of Korea
 ROL – (s) Romanian leu (ISO 4217 currency code)
 ROM – (a) Read-Only Memory – Refuel On the Move – Royal Ontario Museum
 ron – (s) Romanian language (ISO 639-2 code)
 RON – (s) Romanian new leu (ISO 4217 currency code)
 ROP – (i) Render Output Pipeline
 ROPE – Research Opportunity and Performance Evidence
 RORO OR ro-ro – (a) Roll-On/Roll-Off (ferry)
 ROS – (i) Reactive Oxygen Species
 ROTC – (i) Reserve Officer Training Corps ("Rawt-Cee")
 ROU – (s) Romania (ISO 3166 trigram)
 ROV – (i) Remotely Operated Vehicle
 ROW – (i) Right Of Way – Rest Of the World
 ROWPU – (a) Reverse Osmosis Water Purification Unit ("roe-pew")
 ROY G BIV – colors of the prism; Red, Orange, Yellow, Green, Blue, Indigo, Violet
 ROZ – (a/i) Restricted Operations Zone

RP
 RP
 (s) Philippines (FIPS 10-4 country code)
 (i) Release Point
 Role-Playing [relationship potential]
 RPA – (i) Regional Plan Association
 RPD – (i) Recognition-Primed Decision-making
 RPF – (i) Rwandan Patriotic Front
 RPG
 (i) (US-CA) Regional Planning Group
 Report Program Generator
 Rocket Projectile Gun
 Rocket-Propelled Grenade
 Role-Playing Game
 RPI
 (i) Rating percentage index, a metric used in the selection of teams for many (U.S.) NCAA college sports tournaments
 Rensselaer Polytechnic Institute
 Retail price index, measure of inflation in the UK
 RPL – (i) Reverse Polish Lisp
 rpm – (s) revolutions per minute
 RPM
 (i) Rebated Precision Magnum, a family of rifle cartridges manufactured by Weatherby
 Records, Promotion, Music (expansion of the title of a former Canadian music magazine)
 Red Hat Package Manager
 RPN – (i) reverse Polish notation
 RPO
 (i) Radiation Protection Officer
 Regular Production Option
 Run-pass option, an offensive scheme in American football
 RPR FOM – (i/a) Realtime Platform Reference Federation Object Model ("reaper fomm")
 rps – (s) revolutions per second
 RPV – (i) Remotely Piloted Vehicle

RQ
 RQ – (s) Puerto Rico (FIPS 10-4 territory code)

RR
 R&R – (i) Rest & Relaxation
 RRB  – (i) Railroad Retirement Board
 RRN – (i) Recurrence Rate Number
 RRP – (i) Recurrent Respiratory Papillomatosis
 RRS – (i) Racing Rules of Sailing
 RRSP – (i) Registered Retirement Savings Plan (Canada; roughly equivalent to the IRA in the U.S.)

RS
 RS – (s) Russia (FIPS 10-4 country code)
 R&S – (i) Reconnaissance & Surveillance
 R/S – (i) Respectfully Submitted
 RSA
 (i) Regimental Support Area
 Republic of South Africa
 Rivest-Shamir-Adleman encryption
 (s) South Africa (IOC and FIFA trigram, but not ISO 3166)
 RSD
 (i) Reflex Sympathetic Dystrophy
 (s) Serbian dinar (ISO 4217 currency code)
 RSEQ – (i) Réseau du sport étudiant du Québec (French, "Quebec Student Sports Network")
 RSI – (i) Repetitive Strain Injury
 RSJ – (i) Rolled Steel Joist (construction)
 RSN – (i) Real Soon Now (coined by author Jerry Pournelle)
 RSPB – (i) (UK) Royal Society for the Protection of Birds
 RSPCA – (i) Royal Society for the Prevention of Cruelty to Animals
 RSR – (i) Required Supply Rate
 RSRE – (i) UK Royal Signals and Radar Establishment (1976–1991)
 RSRI – (i) Red Sands Research Institute
 RSS – (i) Really Simple Syndication
 RSTA – (i) Reconnaissance, Surveillance, and Target Acquisition
 RSVP – (i) répondez s'il vous plaît (French for "respond if you please")

RT
 RT
 (i) Real Time
 Radio Telephone
 Respiratory therapist
 (p) Return to duty
 RTA – (i) Road traffic accident (British)
 RTBF – (i) Radio-Télévision belge de la Communauté française (French, "Belgian Radio-Television of the French-speaking Community")
 RTCA – (i) RTCA, Inc.
 RTÉ – (i) Raidió Teilifís Éireann
 RTF – (i) Rich Text Format
 RTFM – (i) Read the Fucking/Fine Manual
 RTG
 (i) Radio-isotope Thermoelectric Generator
 Rubber Tyred Gantry crane
 RTGS
 (a) Royal Thai General System of Transcription
 Real Time Gross Settlement
 RTI – (i) Run-Time Infrastructure (Simulation)
 RTL – see entry
 RTLS – (a) Return to Launch Site – period in NASA Space Shuttle assent profile where, during assent, shuttle aborts assent and turns and glides back to landing strip at launch site
 RTPO-RM – (i) Real Time Production Optimization – Reservoir Management
 RTP – (i) Real-time Transport Protocol
 RT-PCR – (i) reverse transcriptase polymerase chain reaction (sometimes real-time polymerase chain reaction). Clarified with "quantitative PCR" ("qPCR") or "reverse transcriptase PCR" where appropriate.
 RTS – see entry
 RTT – (i) Round Trip Timing
 RTV – (i) Rapid Terrain Visualization ACTD – Retro Television Network

RU
 ru – (s) Russian language (ISO 639-1 code)
 Ru – (s) Ruthenium
 RU – (s) Russia (ISO 3166 digram)
 RUB – (s) Russian ruble (ISO 4217 currency code)
 RuBisCO – (p) Ribulose-1,5-bisphosphate carboxylase/oxygenase (enzyme involved in carbon fixation)
 RUC – (i) Royal Ulster Constabulary
 run – (s) Rundi language (Kirundi) (ISO 639-2 code)
 rus – (s) Russian language (ISO 639-2 code)
 RUS – (s) Russia (ISO 3166 trigram)
 RUSI – (p) Royal United Services Institute for Defence Studies

RV
 RV
 (i) Reconnaissance Vehicle
 Recreational Vehicle
 Re-entry Vehicle
 reciprocation void
 RVD
 (p) Rijksvoorlichtingsdienst (Dutch, "Government Information Service")
 (i) Rob Van Dam (American professional wrestler)

RW
 rw – (s) Rwanda language (Kinyarwanda) (ISO 639-1 code)
 RW – (s) Rwanda (ISO 3166 and FIPS 10-4 country code digram)
 RWA – (s) Rwanda (ISO 3166 trigram)
 RWADA – (a) Resident Weighted Average Daily Attendance (New York State term used in public education to indicate the size of a school district, i.e. its number of students)
 RWF – (s) Rwandan franc (ISO 4217 currency code)
 RWR – (i) Radar Warning Receiver
 RWS – (i) Remote Weapon Station

RX
 Rx – (s) Medical prescription (possibly from Latin "recipere", "to take": see entry)
 RX – (s) Receive

Notes and references 

Acronyms R